Emma Appleton is an Australian landscape architect and urban designer notable for her contributions to urban planning and development. She is the Director of City Strategy at the City of Melbourne, Victoria.

Background 
Appleton has held senior public agency and design consultancy roles in Australia and the UK. She was identified in the list of Top 50 Public Sector Women in Victoria (2018). Prior to joining the City of Melbourne, Appleton served as Director of the Office of the Victorian Government Architect's Victorian Design Review Panel (2011-2016) and was Director of Urban Design for regeneration projects at VicUrban (2009-2011). Appleton was also Advisor and Head of Urban Design and Housing at the Commission for Architecture and the Built Environment (CABE 2003-2008) in London. At CABE, she co-authored ‘Creating Successful Neighbourhoods’ and contributed to ‘Creating Successful Masterplans’. Appleton's early appointments were at Gillespies (1999-2002) and Maroochy Shire Council (1997-1999).

Appleton is a Churchill Fellow. Her memorial trust scholarship focussed on the revitalisation of post-industrial contexts in Germany and the Netherlands. She has a Master of Urban Design from Oxford Brookes University (2002-2003), a Graduate Diploma in Landscape Architecture from Queensland University of Technology (1994-1996) and a Bachelor of Design Studies in Architecture from The University of Queensland (1991-1994). Appleton is a Registered Landscape Architect and contributes to advisory boards of design courses at Melbourne universities.  and contributed to the Board for Urban Places for Queensland Government.

Appointments 

Homes Victoria, Director Portfolio Development, Future Projects and Planning 2021
City of Melbourne, Director Strategic Planning 2020-2021 
City of Melbourne, Acting General Manager Strategy, Planning and Climate Change 2019-2020
 City of Melbourne, Manager Urban Strategy 2016-2019
Office of the Victorian Government Architect, Victorian Design Review Panel Director 2011-2016
VicUrban, Director Urban Design - Regeneration 2009-2011
 Commission for Architecture and the Built Environment (CABE), Head of urban design and homes 2005-2008
 Commission for Architecture and the Built Environment (CABE), Advisor / senior advisor 2003-2005

Achievements 

 Women's Planning Network and City of Whittlesea forum MC 2019
University of Melbourne Urban Design Advisory Board Chair
Queensland Government Urban Design and Places Panel member 2016-18
Australian Institute of Landscape Architects (AILA), Victorian Chapter President 2015-17
City of Whitehorse Built Environment Awards invited judge 2015
MPavilion, “Rethinking the Strip: High Streets, Hinterlands and Vacancy” invited panel speaker 2014
5th International Urban Design Conference speaker, Melbourne, Australia 2012
3RRR The Architects - Show 260 - VicUrban radio interview 2010
Winston Churchill Memorial Trust, Churchill Fellowship - The potential of urban waterways in post-industrial cities 2005

Key projects 

 CABE DownUnder initiative with David Rayson, Geoffrey London, Jill Garner, Jenny Rayment, Laura-Jo Mellan, Justin Kelly, Gerry McLoughlin, Bruce Echberg, Leon Yates, Rod Duncan and Bill Chandler.
Creating Successful Neighbourhoods publication
Creating Successful Masterplans publication

References

External links
 AILA Member Profile

Living people
Year of birth missing (living people)
Australian landscape architects
Women landscape architects
City of Melbourne
Australian urban planners